The 2014 Guangzhou International Women's Open was a women's tennis tournament played on outdoor hard courts. It was the 11th edition of the Guangzhou International Women's Open, and part of the WTA International tournaments of the 2014 WTA Tour. It took place in Guangzhou, China, from September 15 through September 20, 2014.

Point distribution

Prize money

1 Qualifiers prize money is also the Round of 32 prize money
* per team

Singles main-draw entrants

Seeds

 1 Rankings are as of September 8, 2014.

Other entrants
The following players received wildcards into the singles main draw:
  Hsieh Su-wei
  Wang Yafan
  Zhu Lin

The following players received entry from the qualifying draw:
  Magda Linette
  Petra Martić
  Yulia Putintseva
  Xu Yifan
  Zhang Kailin
  Zhang Ling

Withdrawals
Before the tournament
  Vania King → replaced by  Patricia Mayr-Achleitner
  Peng Shuai → replaced by  Pauline Parmentier
  Zhang Shuai (right arm injury) → replaced by  Alison Van Uytvanck

Doubles main-draw entrants

Seeds

 1 Rankings are as of September 8, 2014.

Withdrawals
During the tournament
  Elitsa Kostova (viral illness)

Champions

Singles

  Monica Niculescu def.  Alizé Cornet, 6–4, 6–0

Doubles

  Chuang Chia-jung /  Liang Chen def.  Alizé Cornet /  Magda Linette, 2–6, 7–6(7–3), [10–7]

References

External links
 Official website

Guangzhou International Women's Open
Guangzhou International Women's Open
Guangzhou International Women's Open
Guangzhou International Women's Open